Hale v. Henkel, 201 U.S. 43 (1906), was a major United States Supreme Court case in which the Court established the power of a federal grand jury engaged in an investigation into corporate malfeasance to require the corporation in question to surrender its records.

Background
Edwin F. Hale, the petitioner, was the treasurer of MacAndrews and Forbes. Founded in 1850, MacAndrews and Forbes was one of six companies that were under investigation for price fixing of tobacco, in violation of the Sherman Act.

In 1906, US government prosecutors served a grand jury subpoena on Hale that demanded him to testify and turn over corporate documents. Hale appeared before the jury but refused to reply to questions or to produce documents. On his company's behalf, he invoked the Fifth Amendment privilege and was held in contempt. Hale then hired a lawyer and filed a lawsuit, which ultimately came before the Supreme Court.

Hale's argument was that a grand jury cannot require persons representing corporations to testify or demand them to produce documents unless the charges that are being investigated are first explained.

Decision
In a majority opinion written by Justice Henry B. Brown, the Court rejected Hale's argument by maintaining that a grand jury can examine witnesses and demand documentary evidence in connection with a probe into possible crimes, even if it did not identify the scope of its investigation.

The Court then rejected Hale's privilege claim by ruling that the self-incrimination privilege provided to citizens by the Fifth Amendment did not apply to corporations.

In short, the Court held that corporate employees cannot assert the privilege against self-incrimination on behalf of their employer. The Fifth Amendment guarantee "protects individual civil liberties, not economic business interests." The principle that "corporations and other collective entities are treated differently from individuals" under the Fifth Amendment is called the collective entity rule.

The defendant of record in the case was William Henkel, US Marshal.

Quotes
"There is a clear distinction between an individual and a corporation, and the latter, being a creature of the State, has not the constitutional right to refuse to submit its books and papers for an examination at the suit of the State."

"The individual may stand upon his constitutional rights as a citizen. He is entitled to carry on his private business in his own way. His power to contract is unlimited. He owes no duty to the State or to his neighbors to divulge his business, or to open his doors to an investigation, so far as it may tend to criminate [sic] him. He owes no such duty to the State, since he receives nothing therefrom beyond the protection of his life and property. His rights are such as existed by the law of the land long antecedent to the organization of the State, and can only be taken from him by due process of law, and in accordance with the Constitution. Among his rights are a refusal to incriminate himself and the immunity of himself and his property from arrest or seizure except under a warrant of the law. He owes nothing to the public so long as he does not trespass upon their rights."

Aftermath
The Court's subsequent ruling in Wilson v. United States (1911) built upon Hale v. Henkel by prohibiting corporate officers from invoking their own personal Fifth Amendment privilege against self-incrimination to justify a failure to turn over corporate documents. Such a use of the Fifth Amendment privilege, according to the Court, would inhibit the state's visitatorial rights over corporations. Later Supreme Court decisions applied the principle established in Hale v. Henkel to unions (United States v. White (1944)), partnerships (Bellis v. United States (1974)), and sole proprietorships (United States v. Doe (1984)). The cases have reflected the Court's consistent view that the Fifth Amendment privilege should apply to only individual human beings, not artificial entities.

On the other hand, the ruling in Citizens United v. Federal Election Commission (2010) granted corporations an unfettered right of political free speech, and Burwell v. Hobby Lobby (2014) recognized corporations' religious liberties. One observer has described these two most recent rulings as "underscoring a deep rift on the Roberts court about the permissible (or desirable) extent of corporate personhood under the Bill of Rights."

See also
 List of United States Supreme Court cases, volume 201
 List of United States Supreme Court cases
 Lists of United States Supreme Court cases by volume
 List of United States Supreme Court cases by the Fuller Court

References

External links

United States Supreme Court cases
United States Supreme Court cases of the Fuller Court
Tort law
Corporate case law
1906 in United States case law
Grand juries in the United States